Ogoja is a Local Government Area in Cross River State, Nigeria. Its headquarters is Ogoja town in the northeast of the area near the A4 highway at.

It has an area of 972 km² and a population of 171,901 at the 2006 census.

Its St. Benedict’s Cathedral is the episcopal see of the Roman Catholic Diocese of Ogoja.

The postal code of the area is 550.

History 
The town was one of the provinces during pre-colonial times. It consists of many tribal units, including Ishibori (this village has different clans such as Uhmuria, Ikaptang, Ikajor, Ishinyema, Ikariku, Imerakorm) and Igoli as the central town. Mbube, being one of the major tribes, comprises different villages, including: Odajie, Adagum, Ekumtak, Idum, Ojerim, Egbe, Ogberia Ogang & Ogberia Ochoro, Oboso, Benkpe, Edide, Bansan, Aragban, Nkim, etc. Their major source of livelihood is subsistence agriculture, basically farming of cassava, yams, palm oil, palm wine etc. Ekajuk, is one of the major clan in Ogoja Local government area. Divided into Ward I and Ward II, and includes major communities such as Nwang, Ekpogrinya, Esham, Egbong, Nnang, Ewinimba and Bansara (which are collection of a group of villages.)

Present administration
Currently, Ogoja has three arms of government, namely: executive, legislature and judiciary. The executive arm is made up of an elected Chairman, a deputy chairman and supervisors. They are appointed by the chairman and confirmed by the legislature. The previous chairman was Madam Rita Atom from 2013 to 2016. An election has not be conducted,  while the Vice Chairman is Mr. John Orim still remains on seat. The legislative arm comprises ten Councillors who represent the ten wards in Ogoja. The leader of the legislature is Mr Austin Ayungbe - Ekajuk ward II, while the deputy leader is Mr Thomas Ori - Mbube east ward II. Others are; Ms Sarah Amu - Mbube east ward I, Mr Tom Egbang - Mbube west ward I, Mr Peter Odu - Mbube west ward II, Mr Vincent Uga - Nkum-Irede ward, Mr Iyang Nnang - Nkum-Iborr ward, Mr Paul Aganyi - Ekajuk ward I, Mr Anthony Ntaji - Urban ward I, Mr Wogor Umari - Urban ward II. All the officials in the executive and legislative arms are members of the People's Democratic Party (PDP). Their tenure expires in December 2016. The judiciary is headed by the Chief Judge of Ogoja. Ogoja is a town of many reputable families such as:The MOKOSHE’s The Egabe's ,The Ogabi's,The Aggrey's, The Ntaji’s, The Ogabo's, The Ukpo's, The Uga-ifu's, The Amu's.

Ogoja is home to the Federal College of Science.

Transportation 
Bebi Airport, a small airstrip, is close to Ogoja.

References 

Local Government Areas in Cross River State